Giuseppe D’Amato is an Italian historian, specializing in Russia and the former USSR, and a columnist of international politics.

Biography 
After getting a decree in Italy in the nineteen eighties, D'Amato became a scholar of the Russian academician Sigurd Ottovich Schmidt (in Russian Шмидт, Сигурд Оттович) at Moscow’s Historical-Archive Institute (Russian State University for the Humanities) in the nineteen Nineties. He got a Ph.D. in history.

Writing 
D’Amato wrote a book about Italian travellers to Russia in the 15th -16th centuries and studied Russian-Italian relationships. Some of his articles have been published in languages other than Italian. He wrote three books respectively on the subjects of the break-up of USSR, the EU enlargement to the East, and euro-integration.

Selected bibliography 
 Сочинения итальянцев о России XV – XVI конца веков, Москва 1995. (Italian reports on Russia 15th -16th  centuries) Book in Russian.
 Review Foreign descriptions of Muscovy. An Analytic Bibliography of Primary and Secondary Sources by Marshall Poe in «Slavic Review» Vol. 56, No. 3, Autumn 1997, pp. 566 – 567.
 Il Diario del Cambiamento. Urss 1990 – Russia 1993. Greco&Greco editori, Milano, 1998. (The Diary of the Change. USSR 1990 – Russia 1993) Book in Italian.
 Viaggio nell’Hansa baltica. L’Unione europea e l’allargamento ad Est. Greco&Greco editori, Milano, 2004. (Travel to the Baltic Hansa. The European Union and its enlargement to the East) Book in Italian.
 L’EuroSogno e i nuovi Muri ad Est. L’Unione europea e la dimensione orientale. Greco&Greco editori, Milano, 2008. (The EuroDream and the new Walls at East. The European Union and the Eastern dimension) Book in Italian.
  The new Europe in the midst of separations, reconciliations, and new unions,  in «2015 Scientific Economic Magazine», No.1 issue 1, edizioni Palager, Bergamo, 2009.

References

External links 
Greco&Greco  Milano Italy, Authors.
Giuseppe D'Amato Site.

20th-century Italian historians
Historians of Russia
Italian journalists
Italian male journalists
Living people
Year of birth missing (living people)
Place of birth missing (living people)
21st-century Italian historians